Ebrahim Golestan (born 19 October 1922) is an Iranian filmmaker and literary figure with a career spanning half a century. He has lived in Sussex, United Kingdom, since 1975.

He was closely associated with the eminent Iranian poet Forough Farrokhzad, whom he met in his studio in 1958, until her death.  He is said to have inspired her to live more independently. It could also be said that she inspired him in his artistic vision.

Personal life 
Golestan was married to his cousin, Fakhri Golestan. He is the father of Iranian photojournalist Kaveh Golestan, and Lili Golestan, translator and owner and artistic director of the Golestan Gallery in Tehran, Iran. His grandson, Mani Haghighi, is also a film director. His other grandson Mehrak, is a rapper.

Golestan was a member of Tudeh Party of Iran, but he broke away in January 1948.

After Farrokhzâd's death, Golestân was protective of her privacy and memory. For example, in response to the publication of a biographical/critical study by Michael Craig Hillmann called A Lonely Woman: Forugh Farrokhzad and Her Poetry (1987), he published a lengthy attack against Hillmann in a Tehran literary magazine, to which Hillmann responded at length in an article, part of which was also published in the same Tehran literary magazine. In 2005, Golestan's long conversation with Parviz Jahed was published in Iran under the title "Writing with a Camera"(Neveshtan ba Doorbin).

In February 2017, 50 years after Farrokhzad's death, the 94-year-old Golestan broke his silence about his relationship with Forough, speaking to Saeed Kamali Dehghan of The Guardian. Golestan said: "I rue all the years she isn't here, of course, that's obvious. We were very close, but I can't measure how much I had feelings for her. How can I? In kilos? In metres?"

He participated in the 2022 documentary See You Friday, Robinson. Director Mitra Farahani initiated an email exchange between Golestan and French filmmaker Jean-Luc Godard, with emailed text letters from Golestan and "videos, images, and aphorism" responses from Godard.

Golestan turned 100 in October 2022.

Works 
Golestan started his film studio Golestan Films in 1957 and produced some documentaries for the National Iranian Oil Company. A Fire and Moj, Marjan and Khara are amongst these films. Golestan also produced the Forough Farrokhzad film The House is Black.

Books

Stories 
 Âzar, mâh-e âkher-e pâ’iz (Azar, the last month of autumn), 1948 
 Shekâr-e sâyeh (Shadow-hunting), 1955
 Juy-o divâr-o teshneh (The stream, the wall and the thirsty one), 1967
 Madd-o meh (Tide and mist), 1969
 Rooster, 1995
 Neveshtan Ba Dourbin, 2005

Filmography

Documentaries 
 Yek atash (A fire) (1961)
Moj, marjan, khara (1962)
The Hills of Marlik (1963)
  The crown jewels of Iran (1965)

Drama 
 Brick and Mirror (1963)
 Asrar ganj-e dareh-ye jenni (1974, aka The Ghost Valley's Treasure Mysteries)

References

 Hamid Dabashi, Masters & Masterpieces of Iranian Cinema, 451 p. (Mage Publishers, Washington, DC, 2007); Chapter III, pp. 71–106: Ebrahim Golestan; Brick and Mirror.

External links
 Golestan at tirgan Iranian Festival
 
 Articles and short stories by Golestan on Iranian.com
 Ebrahim Golestan - Poetry Foundation
 Video interview with Ebrahim Golestan, by Masoud Behnoud, BBC, 2007
 Jahed, Parviz, “Directors, Ebrahim Golestan”, Directory of World Cinema: Iran, Parviz Jahed (ed.), Intellect, Chicago. (2012). 
 Jahed, Parviz, "Brick and Mirror" ("Khesht va Āyeneh" ), in Persian, 15 May 2007
 Ebrahim Golestan - International Film Festival Rotterdam

1922 births
Iranian emigrants to the United Kingdom
Iranian film directors
Iranian literary critics
Iranian male short story writers
20th-century Iranian writers
Living people
People from Shiraz
Tudeh Party of Iran members
Iranian centenarians
Men centenarians